The 2015–16 UEFA Youth League Domestic Champions Path were played from 29 September to 6 December 2015. A total of 32 teams competed in the Domestic Champions Path to decide 8 of the 24 places in the knockout phase of the 2015–16 UEFA Youth League.

Times up to 24 October 2015 (first round) were CEST (UTC+2), thereafter (second round) times were CET (UTC+1).

Draw
The youth domestic champions of the top 32 associations according to their 2014 UEFA country coefficients entered the Domestic Champions Path. Associations without a youth domestic champion as well as domestic champions already included in the UEFA Champions League path were replaced by the next association in the UEFA ranking.

The 32 teams were drawn into two rounds of two-legged home-and-away ties. The draw was held on 1 September 2015, 13:45 CEST, at the UEFA headquarters in Nyon, Switzerland. There were no seedings, but the 32 teams were split into four groups defined by sporting and geographical criteria prior to the draw.
In the first round, teams in the same group were drawn against each other, with the order of legs decided by draw.
In the second round, the winners from Group 1 were drawn against the winners from Group 2, and the winners from Group 3 were drawn against the winners from Group 4, with the order of legs decided by draw.

Format
In the Domestic Champions Path, each tie was played over two legs, with each team playing one leg at home. The team that scored more goals on aggregate over the two legs advanced to the next round. If the aggregate score was level, the away goals rule was applied, i.e., the team that scored more goals away from home over the two legs advanced. If away goals were also equal, the match was decided by a penalty shoot-out (no extra time was played).

The eight second round winners advanced to the play-offs, where they were joined by the eight group runners-up from the UEFA Champions League Path.

First round
The first legs were played on 29 and 30 September, and the second legs were played on 7, 14, 20 and 21 October 2015.

|}

Notes

4–4 on aggregate. Servette won on away goals.

Puskás Akadémia won 9–4 on aggregate.

Torino won 2–1 on aggregate.

1–1 on aggregate. Rad won 3–2 on penalties.

Middlesbrough won 6–5 on aggregate.

Elfsborg won 2–1 on aggregate.

Anderlecht won 6–1 on aggregate.

Celtic won 6–1 on aggregate.

Ajax won 5–2 on aggregate.

Příbram won 4–1 on aggregate.

Red Bull Salzburg won 5–2 on aggregate.

Midtjylland won 5–2 on aggregate.

Beşiktaş won 6–0 on aggregate.

Spartak Moscow won 4–0 on aggregate.

Viitorul Constanța won 7–3 on aggregate.

Legia Warsaw won 5–2 on aggregate.

Second round
The first legs were played on 4, 5 November and 2 December, and the second legs were played on 24, 25 November and 6 December 2015.

|}

Celtic won 3−1 on aggregate.

Elfsborg won 1–0 on aggregate.

Anderlecht won 4−3 on aggregate. Anderlecht's home match against Servette was originally scheduled for 24 November 2015, 19:30, at the Constant Vanden Stock Stadium, Anderlecht, but was postponed due to the security threats around Brussels in the aftermath of the November 2015 Paris attacks. It was rescheduled for 6 December 2015, 14:00, at the Van Roy Stadium, Denderleeuw, after Servette's home match (initially the first leg with order of legs reversed after original draw) was played on 2 December 2015.Middlesbrough won 6–3 on aggregate.Ajax won 5−1 on aggregate.Red Bull Salzburg won 5–2 on aggregate.Midtjylland won 5–1 on aggregate.Příbram won 2–0 on aggregate.''

References

External links
2015–16 UEFA Youth League

2